Kateema Riettie (born 5 December 1973) is a Jamaican female track and field athlete who competes in the javelin throw. She is a nine-time national champion, taking titles from 2002 to 2017. Riettie has had success at regional level, including a gold medal at the 2010 Central American and Caribbean Games and minor medals at the Central American and Caribbean Championships in Athletics in 2003 and 2008.

Riettie has also represented Jamaica at the 2010 Commonwealth Games and 2011 Pan American Games, being a finalist at both those events. She is based in Bridgeport, Connecticut, where she works as a fitness instructor for the local police department. She moved to the American city in 1989 and attended Southern Connecticut State University, for which she competed athletically.

International competitions

National titles
Jamaican Athletics Championships
Javelin throw: 2002, 2003, 2007, 2010, 2012, 2013, 2014, 2016, 2017

References

External links

Living people
1973 births
Jamaican female javelin throwers
Pan American Games competitors for Jamaica
Athletes (track and field) at the 2011 Pan American Games
Commonwealth Games competitors for Jamaica
Athletes (track and field) at the 2010 Commonwealth Games
Southern Connecticut State University alumni
Jamaican emigrants to the United States
Competitors at the 2010 Central American and Caribbean Games
Competitors at the 2018 Central American and Caribbean Games
Central American and Caribbean Games gold medalists for Jamaica
Jamaican Athletics Championships winners
Central American and Caribbean Games medalists in athletics
20th-century Jamaican women
21st-century Jamaican women